Jennifer or Jenny Wilson may also refer to:

 Jennifer Wilson (actress) (1932–2022), English television actress
 Jennifer Wilson (field hockey) (born 1979), South African field hockey player
 Jennifer Wilson (soprano) (born 1966), American soprano.
 Jennifer P. Wilson (born 1975), American judge
 Hydra (skater), roller derby skater, real name Jennifer Wilson
 Jenny Wilson (politician) (born 1965), American politician in Salt Lake City
 Jenny Wilson (singer) (born 1975), Swedish singer-songwriter
 Jenny Wilson (comics), a character in The Wicked + The Divine